Garip was a group of Turkish poets. The group was also known as the First New Movement. It was composed of Orhan Veli, Oktay Rifat and Melih Cevdet, who had been friends since high school. The name "Garip" signalled a break with the conventional, decadent style of Turkish poetry and literature at the time. 
The group made their mark with a 1941 joint poetry manifesto entitled Garip. After Veli's death in 1950, the two remaining friends developed their own individual styles and began to write novels and theater pieces as well. Rifat and Cevdet participated in the Second New Movement in following years.

The group's poems were published in a number of literary magazines, especially Varlık (Existence) and Yaprak (Leaf). Varlık still exists as a nationally distributed magazine; Yaprak, however, was a literary magazine that was just a bundle of a few pages prepared, edited, and distributed by the Garip poets until the sudden death of Orhan Veli at the age of thirty-six.

References 

Turkish poetry
Turkish poets